Progress is a liberal, pro-Faroese independence political party on the Faroe Islands.

History 

Founded on 9 March 2011 by Poul Michelsen and others as a breakaway from the People's Party, the party won two seats in the October 2011 election to the 33-seat Løgting. Its two MPs in this first election were Poul Michelsen and Janus Rein. However, almost a year after the election, on 6 October 2012, Rein left the party and became an independent member of the Faroese Parliament. He didn't give any clear reason to why he left the party, just that there were some disagreements between him and Poul Michelsen. On the following day, the Faroese website aktuelt.fo, which was run by the newspaper Sosialurin at that time, brought an article saying that the two MPs disagreed on whether Rein should be a candidate for the elections for the city council of Tórshavn or not. The elections for the city councils of the Faroe Islands was to be held on 13 November 2012. Michelsen wanted Rein to be a candidate, but Rein refused and ultimately left the party. A few days later, 25 members of Framsókn wrote an open letter to Rein with an appeal for him to leave his seat in the parliament and give it to the next person on the list. The next person was Hanna Jensen, who took an active part in establishing the party from the beginning. Rein declined to do so. He later joined the People's Party.

In the Løgting election in 2015, Progress got 7.0% of the vote and two seats after polling much higher during the campaign. They subsequently formed a coalition government with Republic and the Social Democrats in which Poul Michelsen became Minister of Business and Foreign Affairs. On 17 September, Annika Olsen, a former Deputy Prime Minister, joined the party. She was previously a member of the People's Party until she left it nine days after the parliamentary election on 9 September 2015. However, after great personal pressure, she chose to leave Framsókn after only 3 days, on 20 September 2015, and took leave from the Løgting for a month.

Current members of the Løgting 

As of the 2022 general snap election:

a. Ruth Vang succeeds founder of the party Poul Michelsen, who left the Logting in March 2020 due to health reasons, as the new MP and leader of the party. The former was listed as #3 on the list, so she was not elected initially as an MP in the 2019 general election.

b. Formerly a member of the People's Party until mid-November 2022.

Election results

Footnotes

External links 

  Progress official website

Political parties in the Faroe Islands
Liberal parties in Denmark
Classical liberal parties
Political parties established in 2011